Cecilia Lugo (born November 22, 1955) is a Mexican contemporary dancer and choreographer. She has participated in groups such as INBA's National Dance Company and the Ballet Folklórico de México.

Career
Cecilia Lugo earned a degree in Latin American studies from the National Autonomous University of Mexico (UNAM). Her artistic training is not only related to dance, but to other aspects of the performing arts, including courses in stage lighting and a diploma in theater pedagogy. She has participated in groups such as INBA's National Dance Company and the Ballet Folklórico de México. The creation of her choreography involves Haitian, Mexican, and Arabic music, and genres such as jazz, rock, contemporary, and mambo.

In 1986, she founded the school Contempodanza, with the goal of aiding students to achieve self-knowledge to allow greater personal growth through art.

On May 4, 2011, she received the José Limón National Contemporary Dance Award at the 25th edition of the festival of the same name.

During the cycle "Danza en el palacio: el arte del movimiento" (Dance in the Palace: The Art of Movement) held in July 2011, Cecilia Lugo celebrated 25 years of experience with the performance of En el umbral (On the Threshold; 1987) – as a tribute to Rosario Castellanos – and Memoria de soles (Memory of Suns; 2010).

"Entre viento y marea" (Between Wind and Tide) was the name of the event commemorating Contempodanza's 30th anniversary.

Awards and recognition
 INBA National Choreography Award for the work Memoria de un Soliloquio, 1986
 Member of the first generation of National Fund for Culture and Arts (FONCA) fellows, 1989
 Special mention in the Oscar López contest, Barcelona, 1989
 Fine Arts Medal for Artistic Merit, 2008
 Member of the FONCA National System of Artistic Creators, 1993–1996, 1997–2000, 2003–2006, 2010–2013
 Part of the México en Escena program from the National Council for Culture and Arts (CONACULTA) and FONCA, 2004, 2007, 2009, 2011
 Contempodanza won the grand prix at the New Prague Dance Festival, July 2008
 Guillermina Bravo Award in recognition of her career, October 10, 2008
 José Limón National Contemporary Dance Award, 2011

Works
 Tarde de abanicos (1987)
 Es… Pérez (1988)
 En el umbral (1989)
 La casa del sol (1990)
 Ruptura: tres personajes y el desierto (1991)
 Ave de arena (1992)

References

External links
 Contempodanza

1955 births
20th-century Mexican dancers
21st-century Mexican dancers
Contemporary dancers
Living people
Mexican choreographers
Mexican female dancers
National Autonomous University of Mexico alumni
People from Tampico, Tamaulipas